Higher Cransworth is a hamlet in the parish of St Breock, Cornwall, England. It is in the civil parish of St Wenn

References

Hamlets in Cornwall